Northern Manitoba (also known as NorMan or Nor-Man) is a geographic and cultural region of the Canadian province of Manitoba. Originally encompassing a small square around the Red River Colony, the province was extended north to the 60th parallel in 1912. The region's specific boundaries vary, as "northern" communities are considered to share certain social and geographic characteristics, regardless of latitude.

Geography

Different bodies of the Government of Manitoba provide different definitions of Northern Manitoba. The most detailed description is set out by Manitoba Indigenous and Northern Relations:

For marketing purposes, Travel Manitoba considers Northern Manitoba to encompass everything north of the 53rd parallel. In contrast, the Look North economic development agency defines the North as consisting of Statistics Canada's Census Divisions 19, 21, 22, and 23. There is also a defined territory of responsibility for the Northern Regional Health Authority, which excludes the town of Churchill.

Regardless of extent, the vast majority of Northern Manitoba is undeveloped wilderness. It is situated on the Canadian Shield and includes the province's Hudson Bay coastline. Forestry, mining and hydro-electric development are significant economic drivers with long-term consequences to the environment in the region. The Indigenous population is significantly higher than in the rest of Manitoba.

Climate

Manitoba's northern region is mostly within in the subarctic climate zone (Köppen climate classification Dfc). It also has some Humid Continental (Koppen Dfb) areas in the south. This region features long and extremely cold winters and brief, warm summers with little precipitation. Overnight temperatures as low as  occur on several days each winter.

Ecology

This region is covered by large extents of stunted Black Spruce dominant forest, with association of Tamarack. There are several mammals in the region including the Arctic fox, Beluga whale and Polar bear. The Polar bear has a significant denning area within the Wapusk National Park, from which annual bear migrations to Hudson Bay are made.

Protected areas 

A single national park, Wapusk National Park; a provincial forest, Cormorant Provincial Forest; several ecological reserves; and more than twenty provincial Parks are located in Northern Manitoba. 
Zed Lake Provincial Park and Burge Lake Provincial Park are located near the town of Lynn Lake.
Caribou River Provincial Park  59.5636°N 96.6611°W
Clearwater Lake Provincial Park 54.08305°N 101.078333°W
Grass River Provincial Park 54.6664°N 100.831°W
Little Limestone Lake Provincial Park 
North Steeprock Lake Provincial Park 
Nueltin Lake Provincial Park 
Numaykoos Lake Provincial Park 57.865277777778°N 95.963333333333°W
Sand Lakes Provincial Park 57.84222°N 98.53°W
Colvin Lake Provincial Park 
It is located at 
It is located at 
It is located at 
Grand Rapids Provincial Park is located at 
It is located at 
It is located at 
It is located at 
It is located at 
It is located at 
It is located at 
It is located at 
It is located at

Economy
The major economic activities are mining and tourism.

Demographics
The region is composed of four census divisions: 19 and 21–23. Its total population according to the 2016 Census of population was 89,637, 7.0% of Manitoba's total population. The largest municipality is the city of Thompson. Other major population centres include the city of Flin Flon and the town of The Pas. Indian reserves comprise more than 49% of the region's population. There are 54 reserves with a total population of 40,572. The largest of these are Norway House 17 and Peguis 1B.

Communities 
The following communities are within the northern Manitoba area:
Churchill
Flin Flon
Gillam
Gods River
Grand Rapids
Granville Lake
IlfordLeaf Rapids
Lynn Lake
Mystery Lake
Snow Lake
South Indian Lake
The Pas
Thompson

Infrastructure
Northern Manitoba is accessed by two Provincial Trunk Highways: PTH 10 to Flin Flon and PTH 6 to Thompson, as well as a network of smaller roads. These are extended in the winter by an additional network of winter roads.

Northern Manitoba is served by a single rail line running north from Winnipeg, via eastern Saskatchewan. The Canadian National Railway operates the line as far as The Pas. At The Pas, the line splits into branches. The Keewatin Railway Company owns the branch connecting The Pas to Pukatawagan, while the Hudson Bay Railway operates a cargo-only branch to Flin Flon and a mixed-use branch connecting to Churchill. All rail service between The Pas and Churchill was suspended from 2017 to 2018 due to a washout of tracks north of Amery. Via Rail passenger service operates on these lines as part of its Winnipeg–Churchill service.

Air transport provides access to many northern communities with 58 airfields in the region. Calm Air and Perimeter Aviation provide scheduled passenger service into larger northern communities. Chartered bush planes land on lakes when airfields are not available.

See also
 First Nations in the Northern Region of Manitoba
 Nelson River Hydroelectric Project
 Southern Manitoba

References

External links
 

 
Geographic regions of Manitoba